The 2015–16 UNLV Lady Rebels basketball team will represent the University of Nevada, Las Vegas during the 2015–16 NCAA Division I women's basketball season. The Lady Rebels, led by eighth year head coach Kathy Olivier. They play their home games at the Thomas & Mack Center and the Cox Pavilion on UNLV's main campus in Paradise, Nevada. They were a member of the Mountain West Conference. They finished the season 18–14, 9–9 in Mountain West play to finish in a tie for fifth place. They advanced to the semifinals of the Mountain West women's tournament where they lost to Fresno State.

Roster

Schedule
Source:

|-
!colspan=9 style="background:#; color:white;"| Exhibition

|-
!colspan=9 style="background:#; color:white;"| Non-conference regular season

|-
!colspan=9 style="background:#; color:white;"| Mountain West regular season

|-
!colspan=9 style="background:#; color:#C10202;"| Mountain West Women's Tournament

See also
2015–16 UNLV Runnin' Rebels basketball team

References 

UNLV
UNLV Lady Rebels basketball seasons
Rebels
Rebels